Vido is an island of the Ionian Islands group of Greece.
It is a small island (less than a kilometer in diameter) at the mouth of the port of Corfu.

History 

The island was known to the ancients as Ptychia. At some point, during the Peloponnesian war, Athenian generals used Ptychia in order to keep in custody some prisoners.

Island was involved in Siege of Corfu (1798–99), Russo-Ottoman allies captured it from French on 28 February 1799.

During the First World War, the island of Corfu served as an island hospital and quarantine for sick Serbian soldiers following the epic retreat of the Serbian army and part of the civilian population through Montenegro and Albania in 1915 following the Austro-German-Bulgarian invasion of Serbia (see Serbian Campaign). While the main camps of the recuperating army were on Corfu itself (a contingent was sent to Bizerte as well, and many of the civilian refugees were accepted by France), the sick and near-dying, mostly soldiers, were treated on Vido to prevent epidemics. In spite of Allied material help, the conditions of both the improvised medical facilities and many of the patients on the island resulted in a high fatality rate. Due to small area of the island and its rocky soil, it soon became necessary to bury the dead in the sea (by weighting the corpses with rocks to prevent them from floating). Over 5,000 people were buried at sea near the island of Vido.

A monument of gratitude to the Greek nation was erected at Vido by Serbs in the 1930s.

Wildlife on the island include peacocks, pheasants and rabbits.
 
The waters around Vido island are sometimes referred to as the Blue Sea Tomb (Serbian: Plava Grobnica), after a poem written by Milutin Bojić after World War I.

See also 
 Serbian Campaign (World War I)
 http://www.angelfire.com/super2/greece/ptychia.html

References

Corfu
Islands of the Ionian Islands (region)
Monuments and memorials in Greece
Serbia in World War I
Landforms of Corfu (regional unit)